Flagship Airlines was a regional airline headquartered on the grounds of Nashville International Airport in Nashville, Tennessee.

History
Flagship Airlines traced its origins to Air Virginia, a commuter and regional feeder air carrier, which later changed names to AVAir. AVAir had rapidly declined into bankruptcy following the AVAir Flight 3378 tragedy. AMR Corporation founded Nashville Eagle out of the assets of AVAir and Air Midwest. Flagship Airlines was formed by the merger of Command Airways into Nashville Eagle on June 1, 1991.

Flagship operated code sharing flights for American Airlines under the American Eagle brand name. The airline served the East Coast and the Bahamas from hubs at Miami, Nashville, New York-JFK, and Raleigh/Durham. The Raleigh/Durham based closed on December 28, 1994.

Ultimately, Flagship Airlines merged with Simmons Airlines and Wings West Airlines to form American Eagle Airlines in 1998. The former Simmons IATA two letter code of MQ became the surviving identifier for the unified airlines. In 2014, the airline was renamed Envoy Air.

Fleet

Accident 
On 13 December 1994, Flagship Airlines Flight 3379, operating for American Eagle, enters an aerodynamic stall and crashes into a wooded area during a missed approach to Raleigh–Durham International Airport in North Carolina. The 2 pilots and 13 of the 18 passengers are killed.

See also 
 List of defunct airlines of the United States

References

Companies based in Nashville, Tennessee
Defunct airlines of the United States